Billy Ray Cyrus is an American country music singer, songwriter, actor and philanthropist. He has released 16 studio albums and 53 singles since 1992, and is best known for his debut single "Achy Breaky Heart". 32 of his singles have charted on the Billboard Hot Country Songs chart between 1992 and 2011.

Cyrus' most successful album to date is his debut album Some Gave All, which has been certified 9× multi-platinum in the United States. The album has also sold more than 20 million copies worldwide and is the best-selling debut album of all time for a solo male artist and remains one of the biggest selling albums of all time.

Studio albums

1990s

2000s

2010s

Compilation albums

Extended plays

Singles

1990s

2000s

2010s and 2020s

As a featured artist

Other charted songs

Videography

Video albums

Music videos

Guest appearances

Album appearances

Notes

References

Country music discographies
Discographies of American artists
Discography